Satarupa Sanyal is a Bengali Indian independent or parallel cinema film director, producer, actress, poet and social activist, based in Kolkata, India.

Early life
She graduated  from the Bidhan Chandra Krishi Viswavidyalaya on Veterinary Science and later enrolled in masters on Veterinary Pathology. 

She started a cultural, literary little magazine "Aw" while she was a student of under graduate which is still continuing till date. Her daughters Chitrangada Satarupa and Ritabhari Chakraborty are actors.

Career
She was trained in Hindustani classical music and Rabindra Sangeet and performed for the All India Radio.

She acted in films since 1985. Initially she performed for Doordarshan plays and telefilms in lead roles. These include performances in Sukh, Aparichita, Uttaradhikar, Bikalpa,  Sukher Jonne, Prasab and Bhanga Aiyna.

She quit acting and involved in film production. She worked as an assistant director and associated script writer to noted director Utpalendu Chakrabarty for seven years. In 1998 she made her debut film "Anu" as a director and producer under her own banner "SCUD". Till date she has directed Atatayee, Tanyabi Firti, Kalo Chita, Once Upon A Time In Kolkata, Tobuo Basanta, Onyo Opalaa.

She has made some important short films like FOOL FOR LOVE, starring Anurag Kashyap and Ritabhari, HOW ABOUT A KISS, starring Rajat Kapoor and Ritabhari.

She served Central Board of Film Certification for four years as a member. She also served as a National jury member for Indian Panorama for several times, jury for the National Award for Feature Film, National Awards for All India Radio and  selection committee jury in MIFF.

Filmography

Feature films
 Onyo Apalaa (2015)
 Once Upon a Time in Kolkata (2014)
 Tobu O Basanta (2012)
 Kalo Chita (2004)
 Tanyabi's Lake (2002)
 Atatayee (2000)
 Anu (1998).

Telefilms
Mahesh - for Akash Bangla
Andhare Alo - Akash Bangla
Musolmanir Golpo - Akash Bangla
Putra Yagna - Akash Bangla
Bhalobasar Rang - Zee Bangla
Sei Meyeta - Doordarshan Kolkata
Janmadatri - ETV Bangla
Kalo Mem - ETV Bangla
Sesh Kheyay - ETV Bangla
Bar Bodhu - ETV Bangla
Satyer Cheye Boro - ETV Bangla
Dandamundo - Tara Muzik
Jungler Chitranatya - Tara Muzik
Waris
Jaler Moto Soja - for UNICEF
Chetna - for West Bengal State AIDS Prevention and Control Society
Ar Bhul Noi - For State Legal Services Authority
 Tahader kotha- For Govt. Of West Bengal
 Golpo noy- For Govt. of West Bengal
 Notun Swapno - For Hugli jilla parishad
 Utho go bharat lakshmi- For State legal services authority
 Bodhon
 Eksho Baro
 Kalo beral
 Kalush

Chakma Films
Tanyabi's Lake (2005)

Documentaries
Surer Guru - A Documentary Film of Jamini Ganguly (1985)
Treasures of Gorumara, Govt. of West Bengal
Jaley Jangaley Jiban, Govt. of West Bengal
Festival & Festivities of Bengal, Central Institute of Indian Languages, Mysore
M Madhusudan Dutta, Central Institute of Indian Languages, Mysore
Rathyatra and Jhanpan Utsav, Central Institute of Indian Languages, Mysore
Jiboner Jalshaghorey, documentary on Manna Dey
" Immortal martyr Jatin Das", Films Division
" Murshidabad the citadel of Bengal Nawabs", Films division
" My son will not be a Chhou dancer", PSBT
" Kabitar kalpurush Pabitra Mukhopadhyay"
 Eto juddho keno?

References

External links
 

1962 births
Living people
Bengali actresses
Film directors from Kolkata
Bengali film directors
Bengali female poets
Bengali-language writers
Scottish Church College alumni
Indian women film directors
Indian documentary filmmakers
Actresses from Kolkata
20th-century Indian actresses
20th-century Indian film directors
21st-century Indian film directors
Film producers from Kolkata
Indian women film producers
Indian women screenwriters
Indian film score composers
Indian women composers
21st-century Indian composers
Musicians from Kolkata
Indian women documentary filmmakers
Women musicians from West Bengal
Businesswomen from West Bengal
Best Lyrics National Film Award winners
20th-century Indian women musicians
20th-century Indian musicians
21st-century Indian women musicians
21st-century women composers